This is a summary of 1997 in music in the United Kingdom, including the official charts from that year.

Summary
Oasis released their highly anticipated third album, Be Here Now, on 21 August (in the UK). It sold 695,761 copies in its first three days to become the fastest selling album in UK history until 2015, when the record was surpassed by Adele's third studio album 25. Radiohead's third album, OK Computer, was released in June and topped the UK Albums Chart for two weeks. Met with widespread critical acclaim, it was voted the greatest album of all time by Q Magazine readers barely months after its release.

Compared to just five years earlier, singles sales were very high this year. From 22 June right through to the end of the year, every single #1 sold at least 100,000 copies a week. Like the previous year, 24 singles topped the chart, double as many as 1992.

The Spice Girls continued their success from 1996, once again getting three number ones. The first was the double A-side songs "Mama" and "Who Do You Think You Are"; the latter of which was the Comic Relief single for 1997. This ensured the group became the first act to have their first four singles all reach number 1. This was followed by "Spice Up Your Life" in October, and "Too Much" in December, which once again gave them the Christmas number one single. They had now become the first act to have their first six singles reach number 1, but this run would be broken in 1998, with "Stop" only reaching #2. Spice Girls also had great success on the album charts as Spice and Spiceworld were two of the top five best sellers of 1997.

The Backstreet Boys released their second international album Backstreet's Back. The album was a massive success reaching number two and selling over 800,000 copies in the U.K. The three singles released from the album were massive hits with "Everybody (Backstreet's Back)" reaching number 3 and "As Long as You Love Me" also reaching number three and staying in the charts for 19 weeks.

Six singles released this year went on to sell over a million. The first to do so was Puff Daddy & Faith Evans' "I'll Be Missing You", a tribute to the late rapper The Notorious B.I.G. In November and December, three consecutive number ones all sold over a million, for only the third time in UK chart history (it had previously happened in 1984 and 1995/6). These were Aqua's "Barbie Girl", the Children in Need charity single "Perfect Day", and "Teletubbies say "Eh-oh!", the theme tune to the popular children's television series Teletubbies. In addition, All Saints' "Never Ever" was released in November and also sold over a million, though it wouldn't reach number one until January 1998.

In November, The Prodigy released "Smack My Bitch Up", which received huge international media attention, due to the fact that many people believed it to be misogynistic and / or that it promotes violence against women. Some stores refused to stock the single and / or album from which it came, and some radio stations refused to play it. A graphic video showing bad behaviour on the part of the protagonist in the music video lead to its showing on television being greatly restricted.

By far the biggest-selling single of the year, though, came from Elton John. In August, Diana, Princess of Wales, was killed in a car crash. At her funeral, John played a rewritten version of "Candle in the Wind" known as "Candle in the Wind 1997", a song originally written about Marilyn Monroe (made #11 in 1974, with a live version reaching #5 in 1988). When released this year, it quickly overtook 1984's "Do They Know It's Christmas?" to become the biggest selling UK single ever, selling 4.86 million copies, and the biggest selling in the world, selling 37 million. It continues to hold the record to this day.

Andrew Glover's string quartet The Fickle Virgin of Seventeen Summers was one of several new classical works by British composers.  Others included Geoffrey Burgon's City Adventures, a percussion concerto written for Scottish virtuoso Evelyn Glennie and premièred by her during the 1997 Proms season.  One of the UK's most prolific classical composers, Wilfred Josephs, died on 17 November.  In April, Nigel Kennedy, now calling himself simply Kennedy, returned to the stage at the Royal Festival Hall after a five-year absence from the concert stage resulting from neck surgery. Towards the end of the year, veteran composer Sir Michael Tippett developed pneumonia while visiting Sweden, which would lead to his death early in 1998.

Events
9 January – David Bowie performs his 50th Birthday Bash concert (the day after his birthday) at Madison Square Garden, New York City, USA with guests Frank Black, The Foo Fighters, Sonic Youth, Robert Smith of The Cure, Lou Reed, and Billy Corgan of The Smashing Pumpkins, with the opening act Placebo. Proceeds from the concert went to the Save the Children fund.
30 January – Noel Gallagher courts controversy in an interview in which he claimed that taking drugs was "like having a cup of tea in the morning".
12 February – David Bowie receives a star on the Hollywood Walk of Fame in Hollywood, USA.
18 February – Brian Harvey is sacked from East 17 after his controversial comments on a radio interview in which he appeared to be condoning the use of the drug ecstasy.
11 March – Paul McCartney receives his knighthood from Queen Elizabeth II.
30 March – The Spice Girls launch Britain's new television channel, Channel 5.
10 April – Nigel Kennedy, now calling himself simply Kennedy, returns to the stage at the Royal Festival Hall after a five-year absence from the concert stage resulting from neck surgery.
3 May 
 5ive's musical career begins after auditions are held in London, UK to find potential band members, with over 3,000 hopefuls showing up to audition.
 The Spice Girls attend the Cannes Film Festival to announce their plans to hit the big screen with Spiceworld: The Movie. A photo call on top of the Hotel Martinez entrance brings the area to a standstill.
At the 42nd Eurovision Song Contest, held in Dublin's Point Theatre, the UK win with "Love Shine a Light", sung by Katrina and the Waves.
11 May – The Spice Girls perform their first British live gig for the Prince's Trust 21st anniversary concert at the Manchester Opera House They break royal protocol by kissing The Prince of Wales (now Charles III) on the cheeks and even pinching his bottom.
15 May 
 The Spice Girls' album Spice reaches number one on the US charts, making them the first British act to top the charts with a debut album.
 While his single "Return of the Mack" climbs up the US Charts, Mark Morrison is sentenced to 3 months in prison, for threatening a police officer with a stun gun.
28 June – The Haçienda club in Manchester closes, it is later demolished and turned into flats, whilst still retaining the "Hacienda" name.
September – Ten-year-old Nicola Benedetti begins her studies at the Yehudi Menuhin School for young musicians under Lord Menuhin and Natasha Boyarskaya.
6 September – Elton John performs "Candle in the Wind" at the Funeral of Diana, Princess of Wales; John Tavener's Song for Athene is performed at the same ceremony, with soprano Lynne Dawson as soloist.
13 September – Release of Elton John's Candle in the Wind remade as a charity tribute to Diana, Princess of Wales. This will be the second best-selling single worldwide of all time "White Christmas" was the first).
6 October – Aphex Twin courts controversy with the video to his single "Come to Daddy'".  The video is banned by TV networks for being "too frightening".
3 November – The Spice Girls release Spiceworld, their second number one album, making the group the first British band since The Beatles to have two albums in the US chart at the same time. Spice and Spiceworld have amassed enough sales for one out of every two people in Britain to own a Spice Girls album.
6 November – The Spice Girls make the decision to take over the running of the group and drop Simon Fuller as their manager.
17 November – The Prodigy release their controversial single "Smack My Bitch Up", which is censored by Radio 1 and the X-rated video is banned from daytime television, except for a brief, late night rotation on MTV before being removed from broadcast 2 weeks later.
20 November – Gary Glitter is arrested after indecent images were found on his computer that he took to a PC World in Bristol for repair.  His appearance in the "Spiceworld: The Movie" is removed from the film as a result.
29 November – The Verve and their manager refuse to allow The Chart Show to show the video for their song "Lucky Man" unless the show is redesigned for them.  
4 and 5 December – Black Sabbath perform a pair of reunion shows in their hometown of Birmingham, England. They are the first full-length concerts by the original lineup of the band since 1978. 
26 December – The Spice Girls release their big screen debut Spiceworld: The Movie, starring Richard E. Grant, Roger Moore, Elton John and Stephen Fry. The movie makes £6.8m in its first week of release.
31 December – Composers Richard Rodney Bennett and Elton John are among those receiving knighthoods in the New Year's Honours List.

Charts

Number-one singles

Number-one albums

Number-one compilation albums

Year-end charts

Best-selling singles
Based on sales from 30 December 1996 to 28 December 1997.

Notes:

Best-selling albums
Based on sales from 30 December 1996 to 28 December 1997.

Notes:

Best-selling compilation albums
Based on sales from 30 December 1996 to 28 December 1997.

Classical music
Thomas Adès – Asyla
Geoffrey Burgon – City Adventures
Peter Maxwell Davies – Concerto for Piano and Orchestra
Alun Hoddinott – Spectrum 2: Lizard
Graham Waterhouse – Celtic Voices and Hale Bopp

Opera
Mark-Anthony Turnage – Twice Through the Heart

Musical films
Cabaret Neiges Noires

Births
23 January – Shaheen Jafargholi, actor and singer
18 February – Ramz, rapper and singer
16 February – Charlie Green, singer
7 April – Laura van der Heijden, cellist
7 October – Lauren Platt, singer and 2014 X Factor semi-finalist
24 October – Raye, R&B singer-songwriter

Deaths
22 January 
Ivor Kirchin, bandleader, 92 
Billy Mackenzie, singer-songwriter (Associates), 39 (suicide)
Wally Whyton, singer-songwriter and broadcaster (The Vipers Skiffle Group), 67
10 February – Brian Connolly, vocalist (Sweet), 51 (liver failure)
18 February – Eric Fenby, music teacher, composer, and amanuensis of Frederick Delius, 90
7 March – Alfred Nieman, pianist and composer, 82
4 June – Ronnie Lane, member of The Small Faces, 51 (multiple sclerosis, pneumonia)
7 June – Paul Reade, composer, 54
10 August – Conlon Nancarrow, composer, 84
8 September – Derek Taylor, press agent for The Beatles, 65
10 October – George Malcolm, pianist, organist, conductor and composer, 80
6 November – Epic Soundtracks, singer-songwriter and drummer, 38 (cause unknown)
17 November – Wilfred Josephs, composer, 70
21 November – Robert Simpson, composer, 76

Music awards

Brit Awards
The 1997 Brit Awards winners were:

Best British producer: John Leckie
Best soundtrack: "Trainspotting"
British album: Manic Street Preachers – "Everything Must Go"
British breakthrough act: Kula Shaker
British dance act: The Prodigy
British female solo artist: Gabrielle
British Group: Manic Street Preachers
British male solo artist: George Michael
British single: Spice Girls – "Wannabe"
British Video: Spice Girls – "Say You'll Be There"
International breakthrough act: Robert Miles
International female: Sheryl Crow
International group: The Fugees
International male: Beck
Outstanding contribution: Bee Gees

Mercury Music Prize
The 1997 Mercury Music Prize was awarded to Roni Size/Reprazent – New Forms.

See also
 1997 in British radio
 1997 in British television
 1997 in the United Kingdom
 List of British films of 1997

References

External links
BBC Radio 1's Chart Show
Official Charts Company

 
British music
British music by year
20th century in music